Lindbergh Boulevard, named after the aviator, Charles Lindbergh, is a section of U.S. Routes 61 and 67 that extends through Missouri. Lindbergh Boulevard is home to Missouri's only traffic tunnel underneath a runway at Lambert–St. Louis International Airport.

History
Lindbergh Boulevard was initially a bypass of St. Louis, designated in about 1930 as Route 77 from Mehlville to the Chain of Rocks Bridge. The part north of Dunn Road, where Route 77 turned off to access the bridge, was initially Route M and later Route 140. Route 77 was later extended at the south end to the Jefferson Barracks Bridge, and US 61 and US 66 were realigned onto the bypass, leaving only this extension as Route 77. That portion became part of US 50 when it was moved onto the bridge, and US 67 eventually replaced Route 140. Prior to Lindbergh crossing the Atlantic ocean, it was named Denny Rd. after the great Denny family of St. Louis.

Route description
Lindbergh Boulevard is signed as US 67 for most of its length and additionally as US 61 south of I-64/US 40. However, between Lemay Ferry Road and its southern terminus at I-255, it carries only US 50. Traveling north, at Lemay Ferry Road, it picks up US 61 and US 67 at Lemay Ferry Road while the latter continues as Route 267. It loses US 50 to I-44, at which point US 61 and US 67 continue north as Kirkwood Road, named after the suburb they pass through. The name Lindbergh Blvd is resumed north of Route 100. Shortly thereafter comes the interchange with I-64/US 40 where US 61 is lost to them traveling westbound. The remainder of Lindbergh Blvd, signed only as US 67, travels north through various communities before turning eastward north of I-270. From Florissant northward, US 67 continues as Highway 67 North, discontinuing the Lindbergh name. US 67 continues northeast towards the northern terminus of Route 367.

See also

References

Charles Lindbergh
Transportation in St. Louis County, Missouri
U.S. Route 50
U.S. Route 61
U.S. Route 67